Alana Smith may refer to:
 Alana Smith (tennis)
 Alana Smith (skateboarder)

See also
 Alan Smith (disambiguation)